Mary Katherine Vernon (born 1953) is an American computer scientist who works as a professor of computer science and industrial engineering at the University of Wisconsin–Madison. Her research concerns high-performance computer architecture and streaming media.

Vernon graduated from the University of California, Los Angeles in 1975 with a B.S. in chemistry, and earned her Ph.D. in computer science from UCLA in 1983 under the supervision of Gerald Estrin. She was named a Fellow of the Association for Computing Machinery in 1996 "for fundamental contributions to performance analysis of parallel computer architectures and for leadership in the computing research community." In 2019, she won the ACM SIGMETRICS Achievement award for "contributions to analytic performance modeling techniques and to analytic design of a wide range of impactful computer and communication system architectures."

Selected publications
.
.
.
.

References

1953 births
Living people
American computer scientists
American women computer scientists
American industrial engineers
University of California, Los Angeles alumni
University of Wisconsin–Madison faculty
American women academics